Victor Edward Milne M.B., CH.B, D.P.H (22 June 1897 – 6 September 1971), was a professional footballer who is best known for his time with Aston Villa. Before playing for Villa, Milne played for Aberdeen. Milne was the son of the first chairman of Aberdeen and a qualified doctor by the time he joined Villa.

Milne retired from football while still at Villa and went on to be club doctor and a local GP.

References
General
 
Specific

Aberdeen F.C. players
Aston Villa F.C. players
1897 births
1971 deaths
Footballers from Aberdeen
Association football defenders
English Football League players
Scottish Football League players
Aston Villa F.C. non-playing staff
English footballers
FA Cup Final players